Daniel Morrissey (28 November 1895 – 4 November 1981) was an Irish Fine Gael politician who served as Minister for Justice from March 1951 to June 1951, Minister for Industry and Commerce from 1948 to 1951 and Leas-Cheann Comhairle of Dáil Éireann from 1928 to 1932. He served as a Teachta Dála (TD) from 1922 to 1951.

Early life
Morrissey was born in Nenagh, County Tipperary, the son of William Morrissey, a small carter-contractor, and his wife Bridget (née Gleeson). He was educated locally and, although he left school against his mother's wishes at the age of 12, he continued his own reading and studies.

Trade unionism
Morrissey's interest in trade unionism began when he was working as a labourer with Great Southern Railways. He left after a dispute with his foreman in 1915 and joined the staff of a national insurance society. Almost at once he began organising trades union in South Tipperary. Rapidly advancing in the trade union movement, he was soon on the Irish Transport and General Workers' Union executive, a delegate to the Irish Trades Union Congress (ITUC) and fraternal delegate to the Scottish Trades Union Congress. Morrissey opposed the ITUC decision not to contest the 1918 general election.

Political career
Morrissey was a successful candidate for the Labour Party at the 1920 local elections. At the 1922 general election, the first national election contested by Labour, he won a seat the Tipperary Mid, North and South constituency. Ernie O'Malley had threatened to shoot Morrissey unless he withdrew his candidacy, but backed down when Dan Breen threatened to shoot him in turn. As a result of the outbreak of the Civil War the new Dáil did not meet for several months. Though Anti-Treaty Sinn Féin TDs abstained, Morrissey and his 16 Labour Party colleagues attended and became the official opposition. In 1923, he became Labour Party Chief Whip and served as Leas-Cheann Comhairle of Dáil Éireann between 1928 and 1932.

In 1931, Morrissey defied the Labour whip and supported the Constitution (Amendment No. 17) Bill, a measure proposed by the government of W. T. Cosgrave against the Irish Republican Army. The Executive Council sought to establish military courts that were empowered to impose sentences – including capital punishment, without appeal – in response to IRA violence. Motivated by two recent murders in his constituency, Morrissey broke ranks with Labour, who thought the measures too authoritarian and voted for the bill, resulting in him being expelled from the party alongside Richard Anthony. He was re-elected as an Independent at the 1932 general election, before joining Cumann na nGaedheal (which became Fine Gael in 1933 after a merger).

Following the 1948 general election, Fine Gael leader Richard Mulcahy proposed the idea of forming a coalition government and ousting Fianna Fáil after 16 years in government. Morrissey was instrumental in securing the support of his former colleagues in the Labour Party and the breakaway National Labour Party. After successful negotiations Morrissey became the first Minister to be appointed in the First Inter-Party Government, as Minister for Industry and Commerce. He proved to be an active Minister, establishing Córas Tráchtála and the Industrial Development Authority as well as nationalising CIÉ. Morrissey was also a member of the negotiating team which concluded the Anglo-Irish Treaty of 1948. He was appointed Minister for Justice in a cabinet reshuffle in 1951 and held the position until the collapse of the government later that year.

Following the 1954 general election, Morrissey was a member of the negotiating team which created the Second Inter-Party Government. He declined a cabinet position due to his age.

Morrissey retired from the Dáil on health grounds at the 1957 general election.

Later life
In retirement from politics, Morrissey returned to his auctioneering business where he worked until 1965. He died at his home in Stillorgan, Dublin, on 4 November 1981.

Appraisal
In Professor Tom Garvin's review of the 1950s News from a New Republic, Morrissey comes in for praise as a moderniser and the instigator of the Industrial Development Authority. Garvin places him with a cross party group including Gerard Sweetman of Fine Gael and William Norton of the Labour Party as well as Seán Lemass of Fianna Fáil who were pushing a modernising agenda.

References

 

1895 births
1981 deaths
Labour Party (Ireland) TDs
Cumann na nGaedheal TDs
Fine Gael TDs
Independent TDs
Members of the 3rd Dáil
Members of the 4th Dáil
Members of the 5th Dáil
Members of the 6th Dáil
Members of the 7th Dáil
Members of the 8th Dáil
Members of the 9th Dáil
Members of the 10th Dáil
Members of the 11th Dáil
Members of the 12th Dáil
Members of the 13th Dáil
Members of the 14th Dáil
Members of the 15th Dáil
Ministers for Justice (Ireland)
People from Nenagh
Politicians from County Tipperary
People of the Irish Civil War (Pro-Treaty side)
Ministers for Enterprise, Trade and Employment